This is a list of ecoregions in Bosnia and Herzegovina.

Terrestrial
Bosnia and Herzegovina is in the Palearctic realm. Ecoregions are listed by biome.

Mediterranean forests, woodlands, and scrub
 Illyrian deciduous forests

Temperate broadleaf and mixed forests
 Balkan mixed forests
 Dinaric Mountains mixed forests
 Pannonian mixed forests

Freshwater
 Dalmatia
 Dniester - Lower Danube

Marine
Bosnia and Herzegovina's short seashore is in the Temperate Northern Atlantic marine realm, and the Mediterranean Sea marine province.
 Adriatic Sea

References
 Abell, R., M. Thieme, C. Revenga, M. Bryer, M. Kottelat, N. Bogutskaya, B. Coad, N. Mandrak, S. Contreras-Balderas, W. Bussing, M. L. J. Stiassny, P. Skelton, G. R. Allen, P. Unmack, A. Naseka, R. Ng, N. Sindorf, J. Robertson, E. Armijo, J. Higgins, T. J. Heibel, E. Wikramanayake, D. Olson, H. L. Lopez, R. E. d. Reis, J. G. Lundberg, M. H. Sabaj Perez, and P. Petry. (2008). Freshwater ecoregions of the world: A new map of biogeographic units for freshwater biodiversity conservation. BioScience 58:403-414, .
 Spalding, Mark D., Helen E. Fox, Gerald R. Allen, Nick Davidson et al. "Marine Ecoregions of the World: A Bioregionalization of Coastal and Shelf Areas". Bioscience Vol. 57 No. 7, July/August 2007, pp. 573–583.

 
Bosnia and Herzegovina
ecoregions